Chris Carrieri (born April 28, 1980 in San Antonio, Texas) is a former American soccer player.

Career

College and Amateur
After a successful high school career at North Stafford High School in Stafford, Virginia, Carrieri played college soccer at the University of North Carolina, where he was hugely successful. In his rookie year, he scored 13 goals and 3 assists, and was named the ACC Rookie of the Year. He did just as well his second year, finishing with 12 goals and 5 assists, and was named a third team NCAA All-American. In his junior season, he led the nation by scoring 25 goals, and added an astonishing 14 assists, and was named an NCAA first-team All-American. He also played club soccer for the Prince William Cardinals.

Professional
In 2000, Carrieri played two games, scoring three goals, with the New Brunswick Brigade in the Premier Development League.  Following his junior season, Carrieri signed a Project-40 contract with MLS. He was drafted first overall in the 2001 MLS SuperDraft by the San Jose Earthquakes, and immediately vowed to lead the team to a championship. Although the Earthquakes won the MLS Cup that year, Carrieri was not there to see it - shortly into the season he was traded to the Colorado Rapids for Junior Agogo. Carrieri had a relatively impressive rookie campaign with the Rapids, registering 5 goals and 4 assists in only 14 games with the team. In his second year with the team, Carrieri established his reputation as a quality American forward in scoring 11 goals and 5 assists for the Rapids, including a remarkable 2nd half hat trick on July 4 (the second in club history) in front of 61,213 fans at Invesco Field at Mile High. In his third year, Carrieri's production slowed, partially because of a contested (and temporary) move to right midfield, and he finished the year with 3 goals and 8 assists. Following the season, Carrieri was not re-signed by the Rapids, apparently partially because of conflicts with the coach Tim Hankinson, and partially because of salary cap concerns.

Carrieri signed before the 2004 season with the Rochester Raging Rhinos of the A-League. He had a solid season with the team, finishing the year with 8 goals and 8 assists in 27 games. After the end of the season, he played one game with the Chicago Fire, after being called up as an injury replacement. Carrieri also briefly played indoor for the Chicago Storm of the MISL. In 2005, with coach Tim Hankinson no longer at the helm, the Rapids brought back Carrieri for tryouts, but did not offer him a contract after pre-season. He then signed with Richmond Kickers of the then A-League. In 2006, Richmond went down to USL-2. Still under contract with the Kickers, Carrieri stayed with the newly demoted club and helped lead them to the 2006 USL Second Division Championship, where he scored the championship winning goal for the Kickers. In 2007, he became one of the first players to sign with the expansion USL First Division club Carolina RailHawks. He played in twenty-eight games, most as a starter, before announcing his retirement from professional soccer on March 18, 2008.

After spending 2008 coaching with the Capital Area Soccer League in Raleigh, North Carolina, Carrieri was coaxed out of retirement in 2009 by the Richmond Kickers, and he subsequently played 5 games and scored 1 goal for the team on the way to winning the 2009 USL2 championship. On January 14, 2010 Richmond announced the re-signing of Carrieri for the 2010 season.

References

External links
Richmond Kickers bio
North Carolina bio

1980 births
Living people
All-American men's college soccer players
American soccer players
Association football midfielders
Chicago Fire FC players
Colorado Rapids players
Major League Soccer first-overall draft picks
Major League Soccer players
New Brunswick Brigade players
North Carolina FC players
North Carolina Tar Heels men's soccer players
People from Stafford, Virginia
Richmond Kickers players
Rochester New York FC players
San Jose Earthquakes draft picks
San Jose Earthquakes players
Soccer players from San Antonio
A-League (1995–2004) players
USL First Division players
USL League Two players